Seasons is first studio album by Levi the Poet. Come&Live! Records released the album on December 11, 2012.

Critical reception

Awarding the album four stars from HM Magazine, Rob Shameless states, "This record shows Levi is not afraid to take risks with what he says." Mark Rice, giving the album four and a half stars for Jesus Freak Hideout, writes, "Seasons is an absolutely brilliant piece of art from start to finish." Rating the album four stars at Indie Vision Music, Jessica Cooper describes, she "can't say enough about the creativity and uniqueness of his work, and Seasons is another great example of that." Jameson Ketchum, in reviewing the album for Substream Magazine, says, "Seasons relentlessly thieves the expanses of the listener’s emotions from beginning to end."

Track listing

References

2012 debut albums
2010s spoken word albums
Spoken word albums by American artists
Levi the Poet albums